Pantelis Thalassinos is a Greek singer and songwriter.

Biography
He was born in Keratsini, Piraeus on 11 June 1958. His father, Michalis, hailed from the island of Chios and his mother, Evangelia, from Serifos. He began performing in 1977, while also working in a shipping company until 1987, with the exception of his 22-month army service in 1980–81. Since then, he has devoted himself to his musical career. He co-founded the group Lathrepivates ("Stowaways") in 1986. Following its dissolution in 1991, he returned to his native Chios, where he founded the Myrovolos live stage. He returned to Athens and live performances in 1994, and is currently member of the Triphono group.

Pantelis Thalassinos has released six solo albums and has participated in more than 30, as a composer or guest singer.

Sources 
 https://web.archive.org/web/20110522051255/http://www.spectacles.gr/PT/PTbio.htm
 http://www.mousikorama.gr/thalassinos_pantelis.html

1958 births
Living people
Greek classical guitarists
Greek entehno singers
Musicians from Piraeus